Hyderabad Metropolitan Water Supply and Sewerage Board (HMWSSB) was established on 1 November 1989, in Hyderabad, India. It looks for the supply of water to the household and sewerage services of the city of Hyderabad.

HMWSSB was formed by the Andhra Pradesh Government with the provisions of Hyderabad Metropolitan Water Supply and Sewerage Act 1989 (Act No.15 of 1989).

References

Water management authorities in India
State agencies of Telangana
Government of Hyderabad, India
1989 establishments in Andhra Pradesh
Government agencies established in 1989